Ojdula is a commune in Covasna County, Transylvania, Romania composed of two villages:
Hilib / Hilib
Ojdula

Demographics

The commune has an absolute Székely Hungarian majority. According to the 2002 Census it has a population of 3,520 of which 92.47% or 3,255 are Hungarian.

History 

It formed part of the Székely Land region of the historical Transylvania province. Until 1918, the village belonged to the Háromszék County of the Kingdom of Hungary. After the Treaty of Trianon of 1920, it became part of Romania.

References

External links 
 www.pro-ozsdola.ro

Communes in Covasna County
Localities in Transylvania